Futebol Clube do Porto is a Portuguese sports club based in Porto that is best known for its professional association football team competing in the country's top-tier division, the Primeira Liga. The club was founded on 28 September 1893 by António Nicolau de Almeida, its first president, and since then has had a total of 31 distinct presidents, some of which have held office in multiple occasions. 

The current president is Jorge Nuno Pinto da Costa, who is also the club's longest-serving chairman, having been in office since April 1982. During his term, Porto have won all of its seven international trophies and the majority of its domestic titles.

List of presidents

References 

Presidents